Dâlma may refer to several villages in Romania:

 Dâlma, a village in Scorțoasa Commune, Buzău County, Romania
 Dâlma, a village in Bala, Mehedinți, Romania

See also 
 Dalma (disambiguation)